Protective Stadium is a football stadium owned and operated by the Birmingham-Jefferson Civic Center Authority in downtown Birmingham, Alabama, U.S.  Since its opening in 2021, the stadium has been named for Protective Life, a financial service holding company based in Birmingham, which pays $1 million per year as part of a 15-year naming rights deal.

The stadium replaced Legion Field as the home of the UAB Blazers football program. The Blazers played their first game in the stadium on October 2, 2021, and lost to Liberty 36–12.

In December 2021, the stadium hosted the Super 7, the football championship games of the Alabama High School Athletic Association, as part of a three-year rotation with Bryant–Denny Stadium in Tuscaloosa and Jordan–Hare Stadium in Auburn that will run through at least 2032. The 2021 Birmingham Bowl was played at the stadium; it was the first event at the new venue to sell out.

The United States Football League has played most of its 2022 games in Birmingham at Protective Stadium with the rest played at Legion Field. The USLC soccer team Birmingham Legion FC will play at Protective Stadium starting in the 2022 season. The stadium hosted the opening and closing ceremonies for the 2022 World Games.

Attendance records

Note: Rankings from AP Poll released prior to game.

Footnotes

References

External links
 

College football venues
UAB Blazers football
Sports venues completed in 2021
American football venues in Alabama
Sports venues in Birmingham, Alabama
2021 establishments in Alabama
Soccer venues in Alabama